The 1978 French Open was a tennis tournament that took place on the outdoor clay courts at the Stade Roland Garros in Paris, France. The tournament ran from 29 May until 11 June. It was the 82nd staging of the French Open, and the first Grand Slam tennis event of 1978.

Finals

Men's singles 

 Björn Borg defeated  Guillermo Vilas, 6–1, 6–1, 6–3 
It was Borg's 5th career Grand Slam title, and his 3rd French Open title.

Women's singles

 Virginia Ruzici defeated  Mima Jaušovec, 6–2, 6–2 
It was Ruzici's 1st (and only) career Grand Slam title.

Men's doubles

 Gene Mayer /  Hank Pfister defeated  José Higueras /  Manuel Orantes, 6–3, 6–2, 6–2

Women's doubles

 Mima Jaušovec /  Virginia Ruzici defeated  Lesley Turner Bowrey /  Gail Sherriff Lovera, 5–7, 6–4, 8–6

Mixed doubles

 Renáta Tomanová /  Pavel Složil defeated  Virginia Ruzici /  Patrice Dominguez, 7–6, retired

Prize money

Total prize money for the event was FF2,035,764.

References

External links
 French Open official website

 
1978 Grand Prix (tennis)
1978 in French tennis
1978 in Paris